Václav Maleček (born 21 April 1974) is a Czech rower. He competed at the 2004 Summer Olympics in Athens with the men's lightweight double sculls where they came ninth.

References

1974 births
Living people 
Czech male rowers
Olympic rowers of the Czech Republic
Rowers at the 2004 Summer Olympics
Rowers from Prague